The following shows a list of records held by certain players and teams in the Women's National Basketball Association (WNBA).

Individual

Scoring

Most points
 9,174 – Diana Taurasi, Phoenix 2004–2014, 2016–present
 7,488 – Tina Thompson, Houston 1997–2008, Los Angeles 2009–2011, Seattle 2012–2013
 7,380 – Tamika Catchings, Indiana 2002–2016

Highest points per game average, career
 20.98 – Cynthia Cooper, Houston 1997–2000, 2003
 20.28 – Elena Delle Donne, Chicago 2013–2016, Washington 2017–present (did not play in 2020)
 19.94 – Breanna Stewart, Seattle 2016–2018, 2020–present

Most points, season
 860 – Diana Taurasi, Phoenix 2006
 820 – Diana Taurasi, Phoenix 2008
 812 – Maya Moore, Minnesota 2014

Highest points per game average, season
 25.29 – Diana Taurasi, Phoenix 2006
 24.12 – Diana Taurasi, Phoenix 2008
 23.88 – Maya Moore, Minnesota 2014

Most points, game
 53 – Liz Cambage, Dallas vs. New York, July 17, 2018 (Regulation)
 51 – Riquna Williams, Tulsa at San Antonio, September 8, 2013 (Regulation)
 48 – Maya Moore, Minnesota vs. Atlanta, July 22, 2014 (2OT)

Most points, half
 35 – Riquna Williams, Tulsa at San Antonio, September 8, 2013
 31 – Cynthia Cooper, Houston at Sacramento, July 25, 1997
 30 – Lisa Leslie, Los Angeles vs. San Antonio, June 25, 2006

Most points, quarter
 22 – Diana Taurasi, Phoenix vs. Los Angeles, July 14, 2006
 22 – Brittney Sykes, Atlanta at Phoenix, July 7, 2019
 22 - Jewell Loyd, Seattle vs. Phoenix, September 17, 2021
 21 – Jewell Loyd, Seattle at New York, August 18, 2021
 20 – Deanna Nolan, Detroit vs. Minnesota, June 20, 2008
 20 – Matee Ajavon, Washington at New York, August 6, 2010
 20 – Maya Moore, Minnesota vs. Tulsa, May 23, 2014
 20 – Shoni Schimmel, Atlanta vs. Phoenix, August 13, 2014
 20 – Rebecca Allen, New York vs. Minnesota, August 13, 2019
 20 - Chelsea Gray, Los Angeles at Indiana, August 29, 2019

Most points, overtime period
 12 – Mwadi Mabika, Los Angeles vs. San Antonio, July 2, 2004
 12 – Sheryl Swoopes, Houston vs. Indiana, May 29, 2005
 12 – Deanna Nolan, Detroit vs. New York, June 3, 2005
 12 – Becky Hammon, San Antonio vs. Detroit, August 29, 2009

Most points by a reserve, game 
 38 – DeWanna Bonner, Phoenix vs. Dallas, June 18, 2016
 36 – Angel McCoughtry, Atlanta at Connecticut, July 31, 2011
 34 – Angel McCoughtry, Atlanta vs. San Antonio, August 20, 2009

Highest points per game average by a reserve, season
Minimum 20 bench appearances
 15.8 – Candice Wiggins, Minnesota 2008
 15.0 – Chamique Holdsclaw, Los Angeles 2006
 12.8 – Angel McCoughtry, Atlanta 2009

Shooting percentage

Highest field goal percentage, career
Minimum 400 field goals
 .5932 – Sylvia Fowles, Chicago 2008–2014, Minnesota 2015–present
 .5601 – Crystal Langhorne, Washington 2008–2013, Seattle 2014–2020
 .5571 – Brittney Griner, Phoenix 2013–present

Highest field goal percentage, season
.6684 – Tamika Williams, Minnesota 2003
.6649 – Nneka Ogwumike, Los Angeles 2016
.6638 – Candice Dupree, Phoenix 2010

Highest field goal percentage, game
Minimum 10 field goals made
1.000 – Monique Currie, Washington at Indiana, May 6, 2014
1.000 – Candice Dupree, Phoenix vs. Tulsa, June 12, 2010
1.000 – Seimone Augustus, Minnesota at Los Angeles, June 8, 2007
1.000 – Nneka Ogwumike, Los Angeles at Dallas, June 11, 2016

Most field goals, none missed, game
12 – Nneka Ogwumike, Los Angeles at Dallas, June 11, 2016
11 – Seimone Augustus, Minnesota at Los Angeles, June 8, 2007
9 – Michelle Snow, Houston vs. Indiana, May 29, 2005 (2OT)
9 – Ann Wauters, San Antonio vs. Sacramento, September 13, 2008
9 – Candice Dupree, Phoenix vs. Tulsa, June 12, 2010

Most field goal attempts, none made, game
12 – Tina Thompson, Houston at Phoenix, July 19, 1999
12 – Tangela Smith, Phoenix at Washington, June 13, 2007
11 – Kamila Vodičková, Seattle vs. Portland, August 9, 2002
11 – Slobodanka Tuvic, Phoenix at Seattle, July 25, 2003
11 – Elena Baranova, New York vs. Detroit, August 1, 2003
11 – Monique Currie, Charlotte at New York, June 27, 2006

Highest three-point field goal percentage, career
Minimum 100 field goals
.458 – Jennifer Azzi, Detroit 1999, Utah 2000–2002, San Antonio 2003
.430 – Laurie Koehn, Washington 2005–2008, Atlanta 2012
.420 – Jeanette Pohlen-Mavunga, Indiana 2011–2017

Highest three-point field goal percentage, season
Minimum 50 attempts
.5313 – Temeka Johnson, Tulsa 2012
.5238 – Laurie Koehn, Washington 2006
.5224 – Alysha Clark, Seattle 2020

Most three-point field goals, none missed, game
6 – Tamika Catchings, Indiana at Orlando, July 3, 2002 (OT)
5 – by many

Most three-point field goal attempts, none made, game
8 – Tina Thompson, Houston at Utah, June 30, 1998 (2OT)
8 – Crystal Robinson, New York vs. Detroit, June 21, 2000
8 – Crystal Robinson, New York vs. Cleveland, August 4, 2001
8 – by 6 more

Highest free-throw percentage, career
Minimum 200 free throws
.938 – Elena Delle Donne, Chicago 2013–2016, Washington 2017–present (did not play in 2020)
.902 – Tiffany Mitchell, Indiana 2016–present
.897 – Becky Hammon, New York 1999–2006, San Antonio 2007–2014

Highest free-throw percentage, season
1.000 – Becky Hammon, San Antonio 2014
.9841 – Eva Nemcova, Cleveland 1999
.9792 – Nicole Powell, Sacramento 2009

Most free throws made, none missed, game
19 – Elena Delle Donne, Chicago at Atlanta, June 24, 2015
17 – Angel McCoughtry, Atlanta at Chicago, June 2, 2012
16 – Elena Delle Donne, Chicago vs. Los Angeles, June 6, 2014

Most free throw attempts, none made, game
8 – Cheryl Ford, Detroit at Charlotte, August 6, 2005 (OT)
7 – Nakia Sanford, Washington vs. Atlanta, June 20, 2008
6 – several

Shots made

Most field goals, career
2,821 – Diana Taurasi, Phoenix 2004–2014, 2016–present
2,768 – Candice Dupree, Chicago 2006–2009, Phoenix 2010–2016, Indiana 2017–present
2,630 – Tina Thompson, Houston 1997–2008, Los Angeles 2009–2011, Seattle 2012–2013

Most field goals, season
298 – Diana Taurasi, Phoenix 2006
296 – Seimone Augustus, Minnesota 2007
295 – Maya Moore, Minnesota 2014

Most field goals, game
18 – Lauren Jackson, Seattle at Washington, July 24, 2007 (OT)
17 – Lauren Jackson, Seattle vs. Los Angeles, August 6, 2003
17 – Diana Taurasi, Phoenix at Houston, August 10, 2006 (3OT)
17 – Jia Perkins, Chicago at Sacramento, June 29, 2007 (2OT)
17 – Betty Lennox, Atlanta at Connecticut, June 27, 2008 (OT)
17 – Riquna Williams, Tulsa at San Antonio, September 8, 2013
17 – Liz Cambage, Dallas vs. New York, July 17, 2018

Most field goals, half
11 – Linda Burgess, Sacramento vs. Utah, August 15, 1998
11 – Lauren Jackson, Seattle vs. Los Angeles, August 6, 2003
11 – Sheryl Swoopes, Houston at Seattle, August 9, 2005
11 – Lisa Leslie, Los Angeles vs. San Antonio, June 25, 2006

Most field goals, quarter
9 – Sylvia Fowles, Chicago at Phoenix, August 1, 2010
8 – Betty Lennox, Atlanta vs. Minnesota, June 3, 2008
8 – Deanna Nolan, Detroit at Washington, July 18, 2008

Most three-point field goals, career
 1,205 – Diana Taurasi, Phoenix 2004–2014, 2016–present
 945 – Sue Bird, Seattle 2002–2012, 2014–2018, 2020–present
 906 – Katie Smith, Minnesota 1999–2005, Detroit 2005–2009, Washington 2010, Seattle 2011–2012, New York 2013

Most three-point field goals, season
121 – Diana Taurasi, Phoenix 2006
106 – Diana Taurasi, Phoenix 2018
100 – Kelsey Plum, Las Vegas 2022

Most three-point field goals, game
9 – Kristi Toliver, Washington at New York, September 10, 2017 (regulation, playoffs)
9 – Kelsey Mitchell, Indiana vs. Connecticut, September 8, 2019 (regulation)
8 – Riquna Williams, Tulsa at San Antonio, September 8, 2013 (regulation)
8 – Diana Taurasi, Phoenix at Houston, August 10, 2006 (3OT)
8 – Diana Taurasi, Phoenix at Tulsa, May 25, 2010
8 – Shekinna Stricklen, Connecticut at Dallas, July 22, 2018 (regulation)
8 – Leilani Mitchell, Phoenix at Washington, July 30, 2019

Most three-point field goals, half
7 – Renee Montgomery, Atlanta at New York, August 12, 2018
6 – Sue Bird, Seattle at Detroit, August 8, 2006
6 – Diana Taurasi, Phoenix at Tulsa, May 25, 2010
6 – Diana Taurasi, Phoenix at Seattle, September 9, 2011
6 – Sami Whitcomb, New York at Seattle, May 26 2017

Most three-point field goals, quarter
5 – Diana Taurasi, Phoenix at Tulsa, May 25, 2010
5 – Maya Moore, Indiana at Minnesota, September 17, 2012
5 – Maya Moore, Los Angeles at Minnesota, June 24, 2016
5 - Sami Whitcomb, Atlanta at Seattle, August 12, 2020
5 - Sami Whitcomb, New York vs. Las Vegas, July 12, 2022

Most free throws, career
2,125 – Diana Taurasi, Phoenix 2004–2014, 2016–present
2,004 – Tamika Catchings, Indiana 2002–2016
1,506 – Angel McCoughtry, Atlanta 2009–2016, 2018–2019, Las Vegas 2020–present

Most free throws, season
246 – Katie Smith, Minnesota 2001
223 – Angel McCoughtry Atlanta 2011
215 – Diana Taurasi, Phoenix 2008

Most free throws, game
22 – Cynthia Cooper, Houston vs. Sacramento, July 3, 1998
19 – Tina Charles, Connecticut vs. Phoenix, June 29, 2013
18 – Katie Smith, Minnesota at Los Angeles, July 8, 2001 (OT)

Most free throws, half
15 – Diana Taurasi, Phoenix vs. Houston, September 7, 2008
14 – Tina Thompson, Houston vs. Sacramento, June 11, 2007
13 – by many

Most free throws, quarter
11 – Shavonte Zellous, Detroit at Atlanta, June 26, 2009
10 – Tina Thompson, Houston vs. Sacramento, June 11, 2007
10 – Nakia Sanford, Washington at Houston, June 22, 2007

Shot attempts

Most attempts, career
7,120 – Diana Taurasi, Phoenix 2004–2014, 2016–present
6,300 – Tina Thompson, Houston 1997–2008, Los Angeles 2009–2011, Seattle 2012–2013
5,803 – Cappie Pondexter, Phoenix 2006–2009, New York 2010–2014, Chicago 2014–2017, Las Vegas 2018, Indiana 2018

Most attempts, season
660 – Diana Taurasi, Phoenix 2006
622 – Tina Charles, New York 2016
620 – Seimone Augustus, Minnesota 2006

Most attempts, game
33 – Diana Taurasi, Phoenix at Houston, August 10, 2006 (3OT)
33 – Diana Taurasi, Phoenix at Seattle, July 14, 2010 (3OT)
32 – Betty Lennox, Atlanta at Connecticut, June 27, 2008 (OT)

Most attempts, half
20 – Wendy Palmer, Utah vs. Los Angeles, August 16, 1997
19 – Sheryl Swoopes, Houston at Los Angeles, August 20, 1999
19 – Chamique Holdsclaw, Washington vs. Los Angeles, June 26, 2000

Most attempts, quarter
12 – Sylvia Fowles, Chicago at Phoenix, August 1, 2010
11 – by many

Most three-point attempts, career
3,569 – Diana Taurasi, Phoenix 2004–2014, 2016–present
2,466 – Katie Smith, Minnesota 1999–2005, Detroit 2005–2009, Washington 2010, Seattle 2011–2012, New York 2013
2,247 – Sue Bird, Seattle 2002–2012, 2014–2018, 2020–present

Most three-point attempts, season
305 – Diana Taurasi, Phoenix 2006
277 – Diana Taurasi, Phoenix 2018
273 – Diana Taurasi, Phoenix 2022

Most three-point attempts, game
16 – Kristi Toliver, Washington at New York, September 10, 2017 (playoffs)
16 – Diana Taurasi, Phoenix at Houston, August 10, 2006 (3OT)
15 – Ruthie Bolton-Holifield, Sacramento at Cleveland, July 10, 1997
15 – Diana Taurasi, Phoenix vs. Washington, July 2, 2006
15 – Diana Taurasi, Phoenix vs. Sacramento, August 13, 2006
15 – Diana Taurasi, Phoenix at Sacramento, August 17, 2007
15 – Shanna Crossley, San Antonio at Minnesota, August 19, 2007

Most three-point attempts, half
12 – Shanna Zolman, San Antonio at Minnesota, August 19, 2007
11 – Belinda Snell, Phoenix vs. Houston, June 24, 2007
10 – Cynthia Cooper, Houston vs. Cleveland, July 29, 1997
10 – Diana Taurasi, Phoenix at San Antonio, August 2, 2007
10 – Renee Montgomery, Connecticut vs. Los Angeles, July 24, 2010

Most three-point attempts, quarter
9 – Amber Jacobs, Minnesota vs. Phoenix, July 3, 2007
8 – Shanna Zolman, San Antonio vs. Phoenix, August 2, 2007
7 – by many

Most free throw attempts, career
2,655 – Diana Taurasi, Phoenix 2004–2014, 2016–present
2,335 – Tamika Catchings, Indiana 2002–2016
2,125 – Lisa Leslie, Los Angeles 1997–2009

Most free throw attempts, season
287 – Angel McCoughtry Atlanta 2011
275 – Katie Smith, Minnesota 2001
248 – A'ja Wilson, Las Vegas 2018

Most free throw attempts, game
24 – Cynthia Cooper, Houston vs. Sacramento, July 3, 1998
24 – Tina Charles, Phoenix vs. Connecticut, June 29, 2013
21 – Swin Cash, Detroit vs. Miami, June 28, 2002 (OT)

Most free throw attempts, half
16 – Lisa Leslie, Los Angeles at New York, June 25, 2000
16 – Kayte Christensen, Phoenix vs. San Antonio, August 22, 2003
16 – Izi Castro Marques, Atlanta vs. Los Angeles, June 27, 2010

Most free throw attempts, quarter
13 – Shavonte Zellous, Detroit at Atlanta, June 26, 2009
12 – Izi Castro Marques, Atlanta vs. Los Angeles, June 27, 2010
11 – Shavonte Zellous, Detroit at Washington, August 11, 2009

Rebounds

Most rebounds, career
3,400 – Sylvia Fowles, Chicago 2008–2014, Minnesota 2015–present
3,356 – Rebekkah Brunson, Sacramento 2004–2009, Minnesota 2010–2018
3,316 – Tamika Catchings, Indiana 2002–2016

Highest rebounds per game average, career
Minimum 100 games
 9.80 – Sylvia Fowles, Chicago 2008–2014, Minnesota 2015–present
 9.73 – Cheryl Ford, Detroit 2003–2009
 9.49 – Tina Charles, Connecticut 2010–2013, New York 2014–2019 (did not play with Washington in 2020)

Most rebounds, season
404 – Sylvia Fowles, Minnesota 2018
403 – Jonquel Jones, Connecticut 2017
398 – Tina Charles, Connecticut 2010

Highest rebounds per game average, season
11.88 – Sylvia Fowles, Minnesota 2018
11.85 – Jonquel Jones, Connecticut 2017
11.71 – Tina Charles, Connecticut 2010

Most rebounds, game
24 – Chamique Holdsclaw, Washington at Charlotte, May 23, 2003
23 – Michelle Snow, Houston at Minnesota, August 4, 2006
23 – Tina Charles, Connecticut vs. Phoenix, June 25, 2010
23 – Tina Charles, Connecticut vs. Los Angeles, June 28, 2011

Most rebounds, half
16 – Janell Burse, Seattle vs. Phoenix, May 23, 2007
15 – Lisa Leslie, Los Angeles vs. New York, June 19, 1998
15 – Latasha Byears, Los Angeles vs. Houston, August 11, 2001
15 – Michelle Snow, Houston at Minnesota, August 4, 2006
15 – Sancho Lyttle, Houston vs. Minnesota, July 17, 2008
15 – Tina Charles, Connecticut at New York, June 27, 2010

Most rebounds, quarter
11 – Erika de Souza, Atlanta vs. Detroit, May 23, 2008
10 – Janell Burse, Seattle vs. Phoenix, May 23, 2007
9 – by many

Most offensive rebounds, career
1,166 – Rebekkah Brunson, Sacramento 2004–2009, Minnesota 2010–2019
1,062 – Taj McWilliams-Franklin, Orlando 1999–2002, Connecticut 2003–2006, Los Angeles 2007, Washington 2008, Detroit 2008–2009, New York 2010, Minnesota 2011–2012
1,049 – Yolanda Griffith, Sacramento 1999–2007, Seattle 2008, Indiana 2009

Most offensive rebounds, season
162 – Yolanda Griffith, Sacramento 2001
148 – Yolanda Griffith, Sacramento 2000
141 – Yolanda Griffith, Sacramento 1999

Most offensive rebounds, game
12 – Nneka Ogwumike, Los Angeles at Indiana, July 12, 2012
12 – Sancho Lyttle, Seattle at Atlanta, August 10, 2010
12 – Cheryl Ford, Detroit at San Antonio, May 22, 2004

Most offensive rebounds, half
10 – Sancho Lyttle, Atlanta vs. Seattle, August 10, 2010
9 – Nneka Ogwumike Los Angeles at Indiana, July 12, 2012
9 – Chasity Melvin, Chicago vs. Phoenix, June 26, 2008

Most offensive rebounds, quarter
6 – Deanna Jackson, Chicago at Indiana, June 21, 2006
6 – Taj McWilliams-Franklin, Connecticut at Indiana, August 9, 2006
6 – Sophia Young, San Antonio vs. Houston, July 27, 2007
6 – Erika de Souza, Atlanta vs. Detroit, May 23, 2008
6 – Sancho Lyttle, Atlanta vs. Seattle, August 10, 2010

Most defensive rebounds, career
2,425 – Lisa Leslie, Los Angeles 1997–2006, 2008–2009
2,407 – Sylvia Fowles, Chicago 2008–2014, Minnesota 2015–present
2,399 – Tamika Catchings, Indiana 2002–2016

Most defensive rebounds, season
 282 – Sylvia Fowles, Minnesota 2018
277 – Breanna Stewart, Seattle 2016
276 – Lisa Leslie, Los Angeles 2004

Most defensive rebounds, game
21 – Amanda Zahui B., New York vs. Las Vegas, August 29, 2020
18 – Cindy Brown, Detroit at Utah, August 10, 1998
17 – Chamique Holdsclaw, Washington at Charlotte, May 23, 2003
17 – Cheryl Ford, Detroit at Connecticut, June 22, 2003 (OT)
17 – Elena Baranova, New York at Connecticut, August 20, 2005
17 – Tina Charles, Connecticut at Atlanta, July 7, 2010 (OT)
17 – Sylvia Fowles, Chicago at New York, July 11, 2010

Most defensive rebounds, half
13 – Amanda Zahui B., New York vs. Las Vegas, August 29, 2020
12 – Sylvia Fowles, Chicago vs. Indiana, July 6, 2010
11 – Tari Phillips, New York at Houston, July 26, 2003
11 – Janell Burse, Seattle vs. Phoenix, May 23, 2007

Most defensive rebounds, quarter
9 – Lisa Leslie, Los Angeles at Charlotte, May 23, 2006
9 – Sylvia Fowles, Chicago vs. Indiana, July 6, 2010
8 – Tina Charles, Connecticut at Atlanta, July 7, 2010

Assists

Most assists, career
 3,048 – Sue Bird, Seattle 2002–2012, 2014–2018, 2020–present
 2,599 – Ticha Penicheiro, Sacramento 1998–2009, Los Angeles 2010–2011, Chicago 2012
 2,345 – Lindsay Whalen, Connecticut 2004–2009, Minnesota 2010–2018

Highest assists per game average, career
Minimum 100 games
 6.66 – Courtney Vandersloot, Chicago 2011–present
 5.72 – Ticha Penicheiro, Sacramento 1998–2009, Los Angeles 2010–2011, Chicago 2012
 5.55 – Sue Bird, Seattle 2002–2012, 2014–2018, 2020–present

Most assists, season
 300 – Courtney Vandersloot, Chicago 2019
 258 – Courtney Vandersloot, Chicago 2018
 236 – Ticha Penicheiro, Sacramento 2000

Highest assists per game average, season
 10.00 – Courtney Vandersloot, Chicago 2020
 9.09 – Courtney Vandersloot, Chicago 2019
 8.60 – Courtney Vandersloot, Chicago 2018

Most assists, game
 18 – Courtney Vandersloot, Chicago at Indiana, August 31, 2020
 16 – Ticha Penicheiro, Sacramento at Cleveland, July 29, 1998
 16 – Ticha Penicheiro, Sacramento vs. Los Angeles, August 3, 2002
 16 - Sue Bird, Seattle at Las Vegas, October 2, 2020
 16 - Courtney Vandersloot, Chicago vs. New York, May 23, 2021
 16 - Sabrina Ionescu, New York vs. Phoenix, July 31, 2022

Most assists, half
 11 – Ticha Penicheiro, Sacramento at Cleveland, July 29, 1998
 11 – Ticha Penicheiro, Sacramento at Utah, June 26, 2000
 11 – Ticha Penicheiro, Sacramento vs. Los Angeles, August 3, 2002

Most assists, quarter
 8 – Lindsay Whalen, Minnesota vs. Connecticut, August 3, 2010
 7 – Shannon Johnson, San Antonio at Los Angeles, July 3, 2006
 7 – Nikki Teasley, Washington at San Antonio, July 21, 2006
 7 – Sue Bird, Seattle at Chicago, June 12, 2007
 7 – Loree Moore, New York at Washington, July 18, 2009
 7 – Ticha Penicheiro, Sacramento at Los Angeles, August 14, 2009
 7 – Ticha Penicheiro, Sacramento at Atlanta, August 25, 2009
 7 – Temeka Johnson, Phoenix at Atlanta, June 29, 2010

Most assists, no turnovers, game
 14 – Jennifer Rizzotti, Cleveland vs. New York, June 21, 2002
 12 – Michelle Cleary, Phoenix vs. Utah, July 19, 2000
 12 – Ticha Penicheiro, Sacramento at Washington, June 23, 2000

Steals

Most steals, career
1,074 – Tamika Catchings, Indiana 2002–2016
764 – Ticha Penicheiro, Sacramento 1998–2009, Los Angeles 2010–2011, Chicago 2012
709 – Alana Beard, Washington 2004–2009, Los Angeles 2012–2019

Highest steals per game average, career
Minimum 100 games
2.35 – Tamika Catchings, Indiana 2002–2016 
2.032 – Angel McCoughtry, Atlanta 2009–2016, 2018–2019, Las Vegas 2020–present
2.028 – Sheryl Swoopes, Houston 1997–2000, 2002–2007, Seattle 2008, Tulsa 2011

Most steals, season
100 – Teresa Weatherspoon, New York 1998
99 – Tamika Catchings, Indiana 2009
94 – Tamika Catchings, Indiana 2002
94 – Tamika Catchings, Indiana 2006

Highest steals per game average, season
3.33 – Teresa Weatherspoon, New York 1998
3.14 – Tamika Catchings, Indiana 2007
3.04 – Teresa Weatherspoon, New York 1997

Most steals, game
10 – Ticha Penicheiro, Sacramento vs. San Antonio, July 10, 2003
9 – Michelle Griffiths, Phoenix at Utah, July 27, 1998
9 – Tamika Catchings, Indiana vs. Minnesota, July 26, 2002

Most steals, half
7 – Cynthia Cooper, Houston at Charlotte, August 11, 1997
7 – Michelle Brogan, Phoenix at Utah, July 27, 1998
7 – Tamika Catchings, Indiana vs. Houston, June 6, 2007
7 – Edwige Lawson-Wade, San Antonio vs. Tulsa, June 11, 2010

Most steals, quarter
5 – by many

Blocks

Most blocks, career
877 – Margo Dydek, Utah 1998–2002, San Antonio 2003–2004, Connecticut 2005–2007, Los Angeles 2008 
822 – Lisa Leslie, Los Angeles 1997–2006, 2008–2009
658 – Brittney Griner, Phoenix 2013–present

Highest blocks per game average, career
Minimum 100 games
2.94 – Brittney Griner, Phoenix 2013–present
2.72 – Margo Dydek, Utah 1998–2002, San Antonio 2003–2004, Connecticut 2005–2007, Los Angeles 2008
2.26 – Lisa Leslie, Los Angeles 1997–2006, 2008–2009

Most blocks, season
129 – Brittney Griner, Phoenix 2014
114 – Margo Dydek, Utah 1998
113 – Margo Dydek, Utah 2001

Highest blocks per game average, season
4.04 – Brittney Griner, Phoenix 2015
3.80 – Margo Dydek, Utah 1998
3.79 – Brittney Griner, Phoenix 2014

Most blocks, game
11 – Brittney Griner, Phoenix at Tulsa, June 29, 2014
10 – Margo Dydek, Utah vs. Orlando, June 7, 2001
10 – Lisa Leslie, Los Angeles vs. Detroit, September 9, 2004

Most blocks, half
7 – Lisa Leslie, Los Angeles vs. Detroit, September 9, 2004
7 – Margo Dydek, Connecticut vs. San Antonio, June 4, 2005
6 – by many

Most blocks, quarter
5 – Brittney Griner, Phoenix vs. Chicago, September 7, 2014
4 – by many

Other Statistics

Most turnovers, season
135 – Ticha Penicheiro, Sacramento 1999
134 – Angel McCoughtry Atlanta 2013
126 – Lisa Leslie, Los Angeles 2006

Most turnovers, game
14 – Kristi Toliver, Tulsa vs. Los Angeles, May 29, 2012
11 – Michelle Edwards, Cleveland vs. Sacramento, August 2, 1997
11 – Chamique Holdsclaw, Washington vs. Utah, July 8, 1999
11 – Angel McCoughtry,  Atlanta at Tulsa July 31, 2014
11 – Betty Lennox, Minnesota at Houston, August 9, 2010
11 – Diana Taurasi, Phoenix vs. New York, July 3, 2010
11 – Crystal Langhorne, Washington vs. Tulsa, June 26, 2011

Least Team Turnovers, Half

• 0 – New York at Minnesota, July 15, 2016

Most personal fouls, season
143 – Cheryl Ford, Detroit 2005
141 – Nakia Sanford, Washington 2007
139 – Janell Burse, Seattle 2005

Most personal fouls, game
6 – by many

Most personal fouls, half
6 – by many

Most personal fouls, quarter
5 – by many

Most disqualifications, career
42 – Lisa Leslie, Los Angeles 1997–2006, 2008–2009
24 – Tangela Smith, Sacramento 1998–2004, Charlotte 2005–2006, Phoenix 2007–2010, Indiana 2011, San Antonio 2012
21 – Natalie Williams, Utah 1999–2002, Indiana 2003–2005
21 – Ruth Riley, Miami 2001–2002, Detroit 2003–2006, San Antonio 2007–2011, Chicago 2012, Atlanta 2013

Most disqualifications, season
7 – Isabelle Fijalkowski, Cleveland 1997
7 – Lisa Leslie, Los Angeles 2000
7 – Lisa Leslie, Los Angeles 2002

Fewest minutes before disqualification, game
5 – Sharon Manning, Miami at Detroit, July 26, 2000
7 – Rushia Brown, Cleveland vs. Utah, July 24, 1999
8 – Asjha Jones, Washington at Portland, June 28, 2002
8 – LaTonya Johnson, Utah vs. Los Angeles, August 9, 2002
8 – Vanessa Hayden, Minnesota vs. Los Angeles, May 31, 2006

Team

Scoring

Highest points per game average, season
93.9 – Phoenix 2010
92.8 – Phoenix 2009
90.4 - Las Vegas 2022
89.0 – Phoenix 2007

Most points, game
127 – Phoenix at Minnesota, July 24, 2010 (2OT)
124 – Minnesota vs. Phoenix, July 24, 2010 (2OT)
123 – Phoenix at Tulsa, July 22, 2010

Most points, half
72 – Detroit vs. Phoenix, July 8, 2007 (2nd)
70 – Minnesota at Phoenix, September 3, 2008 (2nd)
69 – Phoenix vs. Minnesota, July 29, 2010 (1st)

Most points, quarter
42 - Chicago vs. New York, August 7, 2019 (4th)  
41 - Las Vegas vs. Chicago, June 21, 2022 (1st)
40 – Indiana vs. New York, September 1, 2016 (1st)
40 – Seattle vs. Phoenix, August 4, 2007 (1st)
40 – Detroit vs. Phoenix, July 8, 2007 (3rd)

Most points, overtime period
21 – San Antonio vs. Tulsa, August 29, 2009
21 – New York vs. Los Angeles, June 3, 2006
20 – Connecticut vs. Atlanta, June 27, 2008

Lowest points per game average, season
56.9 – Seattle 2000
57.2 – Miami 2000
60.0 – Seattle 2001

Fewest points, game
34 – Washington at Cleveland, May 31, 2001
35 – Miami vs. Cleveland, June 24, 2001
36 – Seattle vs. Cleveland, June 14, 2001
36 – Washington vs. Miami, August 8, 2001

Fewest points, half
8 – Detroit at Houston, July 6, 2002
9 – Seattle vs. Cleveland, June 14, 2001
11 – Minnesota vs. Houston, June 30, 2001

Fewest points, quarter
1 – Chicago at New York, August 4, 2011
2 - Atlanta at Minnesota, August 3, 2017
2 - New York vs. Indiana, August 4, 2018
2 - Indiana vs. Washington, August 15, 2018

Largest margin of victory, game
59 – Minnesota (111) vs. Indiana (52), August 18, 2017
46 – Seattle (111) vs. Tulsa (65), August 7, 2010
45 – Houston (110) at Washington (65), August 17, 1998

Largest margin of victory, road game
45 – Houston (110) at Washington (65), August 17, 1998
39 – Sacramento (91) at Minnesota (52), July 3, 2001
38 – Indiana (89) at Minnesota (51), June 6, 2010

Largest deficits overcome to win
28 – Chicago at Las Vegas, June 21, 2022 (Chicago trailed 51–23, won 104–95)
25 – Los Angeles at Detroit, June 26, 2005 (Detroit trailed 35–10, won 79–73)
25 – Atlanta at Minnesota, September 7, 2012 (Minnesota trailed 50–25, won 97–93 (2OT))

Most points by all reserves, game
62 – New York vs. Phoenix, June 22, 2008
61 – Los Angeles vs. Utah, June 28, 1999
58 – San Antonio at Atlanta, June 26, 2011

Highest points per game average by all reserves, season
33.9 – Minnesota, 2008 (Wiggins 15.8)
33.4 – Sacramento, 2006 (Buescher 9.7)
29.0 – Los Angeles, 2006 (Holdsclaw 15.0)

Field goals and percentage

Most field goals, game
47 – Phoenix at Minnesota, July 24, 2010 (2OT)
47 – Phoenix vs. Minnesota, July 29, 2010
46 – Phoenix at Tulsa, July 22, 2010
46 – Connecticut vs. Las Vegas, August 5, 2018

Most three-point field goals, game
23 - Las Vegas vs. Phoenix, August 20, 2022
18 - Las Vegas vs. Los Angeles, May 23, 2022
18 - Seattle vs. Atlanta, August 12, 2020
18 - Washington vs. Indiana, August 18, 2019
17 - Seattle vs. Las Vegas, May 31, 2018

Highest field goal percentage, game
.695 – Minnesota vs. Tulsa, July 10, 2012
.655 – Los Angeles vs. Houston, June 15, 2005
.654 – Houston at Washington, July 26, 2005

Fewest field goals, game
9 – Indiana at Charlotte, June 26, 2004
10 – Miami vs. Seattle, July 10, 2001
10 – Miami vs. Cleveland, June 24, 2001
10 – Washington vs. Miami, August 8, 2001

Fewest three-point field goals, game
0 – by many

Lowest field goal percentage, game
.182 – Miami vs. Cleveland, June 24, 2001
.188 – Indiana at Charlotte, June 26, 2004
.196 – Washington vs. Miami, August 8, 2001

Most field goal attempts, game
100 – Seattle at Phoenix, July 14, 2010 (3OT)
98 – Phoenix vs. Seattle, July 14, 2010 (3OT)
97 – Phoenix vs. Atlanta, July 19, 2008

Most three-point field goal attempts, game
36 – New York vs. Los Angeles, June 3, 2006 (OT)
36 – Phoenix at Detroit, July 8, 2007
36 – Phoenix at Tulsa, May 25, 2010

Rebounds

Most rebounds, game
57 – Seattle at Phoenix, July 14, 2010 (3OT)
57 – Seattle vs. Tulsa, August 7, 2010
57 – Tulsa Shock at San Antonio Stars, June 14, 2015

Fewest rebounds, game
13 – Miami at Orlando, August 11, 2001
14 – New York at Charlotte, July 30, 1999
14 – Detroit vs. Utah, August 7, 2001

Most offensive rebounds, game
30 – Tulsa Shock vs. San Antonio Stars, June 14, 2015
25 – Sacramento at Washington, May 22, 2007
25 – Chicago vs. Phoenix, June 26, 2008

Fewest offensive rebounds, game
0 – Houston vs. Phoenix, July 27, 2006
1 – by many

Most defensive rebounds, game
42 – Detroit vs. Phoenix, July 8, 2007
40 – Utah vs. Detroit, July 6, 1999 (2OT)
40 – San Antonio vs. Minnesota, June 16, 2006
40 – Atlanta vs. Connecticut, July 7, 2010 (OT)

Fewest defensive rebounds, game
6 – Houston at Los Angeles, June 15, 2005
8 – Washington at New York, August 13, 1998
8 – Miami vs. Minnesota, May 28, 2002

Assists

Most assists, game
37 - Seattle Storm at Chicago Sky, August 10, 2022
35 – Minnesota vs. Chicago, September 1, 2017
35 - Chicago Sky vs Connecticut Sun, August 10, 2018
34 – Seattle Storm at Chicago Sky, August 20, 2017
34 – Los Angeles Sparks at Chicago Sky, August 18, 2017

Fewest assists, game
3 – Cleveland at Detroit, July 28, 2001
3 – Minnesota at Seattle, August 8, 2003
3 – Tulsa vs. Washington, July 3, 2010

Turnovers

Most turnovers, game
33 – Utah at New York, July 17, 1997
33 – Utah at Phoenix, August 17, 1997 (OT)
33 – Washington at Houston, June 29, 1998

Fewest turnovers, game
4 – Orlando vs. Washington, August 15, 1999
4 – Connecticut at Detroit, July 21, 2004
4 – New York vs. Connecticut, July 7, 2005
4 – Chicago vs. San Antonio, July 14, 2010
4 – Los Angeles at Chicago, July 16, 2010

Team miscellaneous
Highest winning percentage, season – .900, Houston 1998
Highest winning percentage, home games, season – 1.000, Los Angeles 2001; Seattle 2010
Highest winning percentage, road games, season – .867, Houston 1998
Lowest winning percentage, season – .088, Tulsa 2011
Lowest winning percentage, home games, season – .059, Atlanta 2008
Lowest winning percentage, road games, season – .000, Washington 1998
Most wins, season – 29, Phoenix 2014
Most losses, season – 31, Tulsa 2011, Indiana 2022
Most consecutive games won – 18, Los Angeles 2001
Most consecutive home games won – 28, Los Angeles 2000–2002
Most consecutive road games won – 12, Los Angeles 2000
Most consecutive wins to begin season – 13, Minnesota 2016
Most consecutive losses to begin season – 17, Atlanta 2008
Most consecutive games lost – 20, Tulsa 2011
Most consecutive home games lost – 13, San Antonio 2016–2017
Most consecutive road games lost – 21, Phoenix 2001–2002
Most overtime periods, game – 4, Washington at Seattle, July 3, 2001
Most consecutive playoff appearances – 11, Minnesota 2011–2021

References

External links
 All-Time Leaders at WNBA.com
 WNBA Leaders and Records at Basketball-Reference.com